Crisis Center is an American drama television series that aired on NBC from February 28 until April 4, 1997.

Premise
The series revolve around a crisis center in San Francisco where they deal with suicidal callers, hostage situations and mothers in labor.

Cast
Kellie Martin as Kathy Goodman
Matt Roth as Dr. Rick Buckley
Nia Peeples as Lily Gannon
Tina Lifford as Tess Robinson
Clifton Gonzalez-Gonzalez as Nando Taylor
Dana Ashbrook as Gary McDermott

Episodes

References

External links

1997 American television series debuts
1997 American television series endings
1990s American drama television series
1990s American medical television series
English-language television shows
NBC original programming
Television series by CBS Studios
Television series by Universal Television
Television shows set in San Francisco